Alexandra Elizabeth Gouldie (born May 13, 1991) is a former American Paralympic volleyballer.

Biography
Gouldie was born in Grand Island, Nebraska. She took part at 2008 Paralympics which were held in Beijing, China where she got her silver medal by leading her team to win 3–0 against Latvia. The same year she participated at World Organization Volleyball for Disabled at Ismaïlia, Egypt where she won a bronze one.

References

External links
 
 

1991 births
Living people
Paralympic volleyball players of the United States
Paralympic silver medalists for the United States
Volleyball players at the 2008 Summer Paralympics
Medalists at the 2008 Summer Paralympics
American women's volleyball players
American sitting volleyball players
Women's sitting volleyball players
People from Grand Island, Nebraska
People from St. Paul, Nebraska
Paralympic medalists in volleyball
21st-century American women